The following is a list of towns in England and Wales which became urban districts when the Local Government Act 1894 came into force from December 1894 – January 1895. For urban districts formed after this see: Urban districts formed in England and Wales 1896–1974.Note for table: 'UD' stands for Urban District, 'RD' stands for Rural District, 'MB' stands for Municipal Borough, 'Met. B' stands for Metropolitan Borough and 'CB' stands for County Borough.

1894
Initially 774 urban districts were created under the Local Government Act 1894.

Abolished before 1974

Abolished in 1974

1895
There were 11 urban districts formed in 1895, however 10 districts were abolished meaning there was only a net increase of one to 775.

Sources

 
 
 
 
 
England geography-related lists
Former subdivisions of England
Local government in the United Kingdom
 
 
Urban districts of the United Kingdom
Wales geography-related lists
England